Horace and Pete is an American web series created, written, and directed by Louis C.K., who describes it as a tragedy. In addition to C.K., the series stars Alan Alda, Steve Buscemi, Edie Falco and Jessica Lange. Dealing with the themes of abuse, mental illness, politics and family dynamics, the series focuses on Horace (played by C.K.), Pete (Buscemi), and Sylvia (Falco), the owners of Horace and Pete's, a run-down Brooklyn bar. The first episode was released on C.K.'s website without any prior announcements on January 30, 2016. New episodes premiered weekly until the tenth episode was released on April 2, 2016.

Synopsis
The series is set in a run-down bar called Horace and Pete's in Brooklyn, New York. The bar has been owned by the same family since 1916 and has been passed down through several generations, always with a Horace and a Pete in charge. The current owners are the 49-year-old Horace Wittel VIII and his 52-year-old cousin Pete. The bar is old-fashioned and tradition bound, serving no mixed drinks, with the only beer they sell being Budweiser on tap. For many years, the management has been watering down the drinks, and pricing is variable, depending on whether the customer is a regular or a hipster who is drinking there "ironically". While there is a narrative concerning the relationships between the members of the family and the future of the bar, there are many scenes which take place in the bar and do not advance the main plot.

Cast and characters

Main cast
 Horace Wittel VIII (Louis C.K.) is 49 years old and divorced. He is estranged from his son Horace Wittel IX, who refuses all contact with him, and has a frosty relationship with his daughter Alice. Formerly an accountant, he inherited the bar one year prior to the start of the series after the death of his abusive father Horace Wittel VII. He carries on the tradition of the family bar but with little enthusiasm for the role. He is prone to bouts of depression, but nevertheless is quite successful at attracting women. He has good people skills and frequently becomes the peacemaker in conflict situations. However, he also has a callous streak.
 Pete Wittel (Steve Buscemi) is 52 years old and is co-owner of the bar. He was raised with Horace and Sylvia as their brother, but is their biological cousin; his biological father is Uncle Pete. As a teenager, he was handsome, athletic, and outgoing, but he was later crippled by a severe mental illness and institutionalized for several years. He is now dependent on an expensive drug called Probitol to function, and on the family bar for his livelihood. He is generally kind and concertedly respectful towards other people, especially women, but struggles with the limitations and consequences of his condition, making him sensitive to perceived criticism, especially where Horace is concerned, leading to frequent minor spats between the two.
 Sylvia Wittel (Edie Falco) is in her early fifties and is Horace's older sister. She was a rebellious and unhappy teenager, and is tough and assertive as an adult. She has a son, Franklin, who is at school, and a daughter, Brenda, who is emotional and protective of her, much to her irritation. She hates the bar and all the misery associated with it, and wants to shut it down and claim her share of the inheritance to help pay for her chemotherapy, as she has just been diagnosed with cancer. Despite this, she has a good relationship with Horace, who persuades her to become involved in the bar's management. She can also be startlingly blunt when she finds cause to criticize someone, to the point of cruelty.
 Leon (Steven Wright) is in his sixties and has been a regular at the bar for many years. A recovering alcoholic, he continues to visit the bar for companionship, drinking only apple juice. He speaks infrequently, is laconic and has a dry sense of humor. He is chivalrous and believes a man should never be rude to a woman regardless of the circumstances.
 Kurt (Kurt Metzger), a regular at the bar, is an opinionated loudmouth in his thirties. He has a nihilistic world view, and believes it would be good idea to elect Donald Trump in order to destroy the current political system. It is unclear what he does for a living or what his source of income is. He is crude and insensitive.
 Uncle Pete (Alan Alda) is about 80 years old and was the co-owner of the bar before handing over the reins to Pete after Horace VII's death. He continues to tend the bar and in effect runs it, bullying Horace and Pete and drawing his own indeterminate salary from the bar's takings. He is an acerbic, foul-mouthed bigot who insults everyone and is particularly abusive towards his family, but his rants are often a source of some entertainment to the bar's patrons. He reveals in the first episode that he is Pete's biological father (his mother is unknown). He is the only Wittel who treats Marsha as family and he sometimes shows other patrons, particularly women, a degree of warmth and respect, but is hostile towards anyone who challenges his bigoted views. Horace VIII's father Horace VII was Uncle Pete's first cousin.
 Marsha (Jessica Lange) is in her sixties and was Horace Wittel VII's last sexual partner before his death. Subsequently Uncle Pete has continued to give her a share of the bar's takings and give her free drinks. She is a chronic alcoholic and has been drinking since her early teens, relying on her sex appeal to attract men to support her habit. She is loud and often very rude, speaking her mind without social filters.

Recurring and additional cast
 Alice Wittel (Aidy Bryant) is Horace's daughter. She is 23 years old and is nearing the end of her law studies. Horace was absent from her life for most of her childhood, and she still bitterly resents him for causing the family to break up. Unlike her brother Horace Wittel IX, who refuses all contact, she meets with her father on several occasions, but rebuffs all his attempts to bond with her. She is emotionally cold; however, she is on friendly terms with her uncle Pete.
 Tricia (Maria Dizzia) is a pleasant young woman who has Tourette syndrome, causing her to involuntarily make offensive utterances. She befriended Pete during his stay at a psychiatric hospital. When she attempts to renew their friendship Pete initially doesn't want to see her, associating her with the worst period of his life, but he relents and they eventually become romantically involved.
 Nick (Nick DiPaolo) is 49 years old and is an assistant DA. He is not particularly enthusiastic about his job and sees no prospects for advancement. He is politically conservative and often argues with other bar patrons. He is a semi-regular at the bar and sometimes picks up women there for one night stands.
 Tom (Tom Noonan), a regular at the bar, is a lugubrious man in his 60s who is a failed musician and actor. He sometimes plays the piano.
 Ricardo (Craig muMs Grant), bar patron and police officer
 Melissa (Liza Treyger)
 Carl (Greer Barnes)
 Rhonda (Karen Pittman)
 Dom (Dov Davidoff)
 Mark (Mark Normand)
 Jimmy (Colin Quinn)
 Horace IX (Angus T. Jones)
 Horace VII (Burt Young)
 Young Horace VIII (Jack Gore)
 Mara (Amy Sedaris)
 Young Silvia (Sofia Hublitz)
 Magician at the Bar (David Blaine)

Production

Conception and casting 

C.K. said that the show was inspired by Mike Leigh's 1977 play, Abigail's Party, which was written and developed using Leigh's improvisation method, and was then made into a multi-camera TV play. Abigail's Party's story takes place during the course of a night, over drinks and dinner. It is one scene over two hours. C.K. also credits playwright Annie Baker both in discussion about the show and in the credits, as he saw her play The Flick, and was influenced by her work there. She also helped him with the writing of the first few episodes.

The idea was a sitcom with no audience or laugh-track, multi-camera, shot from a stage-like perspective (i.e., from one angle). The focus would be, similar to Abigail's Party, centered on a family. Steve Buscemi came on board first, then Edie Falco and Jessica Lange. C.K. said that the cast will get a portion of the profits.

For the role of Pete Wittel, C.K. originally tried to cast Joe Pesci. In a conversation over the phone, Pesci declined the role, so C.K. went to his home to try to persuade him. After discussing about the script, Pesci admitted that he liked it, yet still said no. C.K. had also offered the role to Jack Nicholson and Christopher Walken, before eventually considering and signing Alan Alda. C.K.'s character's name is a homage to the late comedian Harris Wittels, who opened for C.K. and was someone C.K. considered a talented comedian of note.

C.K. started writing the show in October 2015 and then as cast members came on board, he held rehearsals in January 2016. Sections of the show's scripts were kept intentionally blank with placeholders to insert current events, like the upcoming presidential election.

Filming 
C.K. said that each episode cost half a million dollars to shoot. The show was shot in a studio in New York City called NEP Penn Studios, which is located in the Hotel Pennsylvania across from Madison Square Garden. They shot the show starting in early January 2016, with production lasting about five or six weeks. Using the look and feel of Abigail's Party, C.K. used a color-coded shot list that was created during rehearsals to enable live-switching between cameras.

The series had frequent references to current events during the barroom discussions. This was made possible by the short time between the production and release of the episodes (less than a week). A quick line-cut would enable a fast turnaround to distribution. There would be no ad breaks for commercials and no standards & practices that would restrict language. Also important to C.K., and why he did not want to release the show via a television network, was that he wanted the show to be secret and unexpected, where the audience had little to no information before viewing, which he said would have been impossible with a traditional TV show model.

The strategy was that C.K. would make the first four episodes and use the money people paid for those to fund the rest of the season. Due to lack of promotion, there was not enough money and he went into debt to fund the production of the show. After he finished production on the show C.K. went on a promotional tour to promote the show and recoup some of the costs. C.K. said that what he was going to be doing (i.e., producing shows of varying length, using a theater-based approach to storytelling, distributing the show himself) was going to be so extreme he did not want to have funding from other sources, like FX Networks, even though notable entertainment professionals, including Lorne Michaels, strongly discouraged C.K. from doing this.

Music 

The theme song was written and performed by Paul Simon. C.K. asked Simon to write the theme song via email, let Simon read all 10 scripts, and then the two went into the studio for a day to work on the song. The song was subsequently included on the deluxe edition of Simon's 2016 album, Stranger to Stranger. Simon makes a brief appearance as a customer in a flashback scene in episode 10. "America" by Simon & Garfunkel, and Dion DiMucci and Paul Simon's "New York Is My Home" are featured in different episodes of the show.

Distribution 
The first episode was released on January 30, 2016, with no press or previous mention. Subscribers to C.K.'s mailing list received an email notice of its availability. It is a continuation of the sell-through direct-to-consumer model that C.K. used successfully in prior releases of content.

C.K. explained that the direct-to-consumer, sell-through model of pricing the pilot at $5 would allow him to produce following episodes. On his website, he discussed the challenges of creating, shooting, and releasing a multi-camera TV show and addressed the pricing, revealing a tiered cheaper price for the remaining episodes of the show: $5 for the first episode, $2 for the next, and the $3 for the rest of the episodes. The show has a very short production-release model, as episode 2 was being shot the week following the pilot, and was released a week after the first episode was made public, with following episodes to come. All of the ten episodes were edited by C.K.'s former Louie assistant editor Gina Sansom, and had no predetermined running time, ranging in length from 30 minutes to 67 minutes. The closing credits for episode 5 include the notice: End of Act 1. At the close of episode 10, C.K. announces "That's a wrap on Horace and Pete" while the cast applaud in a kind of curtain call. Shortly after the final episode of season one was released, C.K. revealed that guest actress Amy Sedaris, a late casting decision, had developed her own character and improvised all her dialogue.

Horace and Petes production, marketing, and distribution model sparked much debate over the strategic, financial, creative options available to content creators. C.K.'s work was compared to Kanye West as both navigate funding singular artistic visions that focus on creative control and in C.K.'s case, distribution, funding, and publicity methods outside the typical television model.

C.K., during an extensive discussion with fellow comic Marc Maron, said that he wanted to open source the process by which he created the show, transparently sharing as much information as possible so others might be able to adopt and learn from his experience.

At The New Yorker Festival, C.K. told Emily Nussbaum that he sold the show to Hulu.

Episodes

Reception

Critical response
Critics have been generally positive towards Horace and Pete, with a consensus and praise that the show feels like a filmed stage play. It was favorably compared to Playhouse 90, with critic Matt Zoller Seitz from Vulture calling it "aggressively classical." The show has been described as being filmed live, with a realism that reflects technical imperfections that add to subtle moments by a cast of veteran actors. James Poniewozik of The New York Times called it a "messy experiment that stays just on the good side of pretentiousness. But it's also probing, engaged and moving." Entertainment Weekly's Ray Rahman said of the performances, "Alda is magnetic as he descends into sadness, while Falco injects Horace and Pete with tissue-worthy emotion. Buscemi is masterfully Buscemi-ian, and C.K. has only gotten better at making shame-filled frowny faces." Alan Sepinwall from HitFix declared Laurie Metcalf's performance the "year's best". Filmmaker Stephen Cone gave significant praise to the series in terms of Louis C.K.'s hybridization of film, TV, and theater, comparing him to French film director Alain Resnais and stating: "Leave it to Louis C.K. to save cinema – whatever that means – with a goddamn web series." Seitz focused on the show's unique use of silence, in part a noted homage to a quote by recently deceased Garry Shandling on how there is value and meaning to be had in silence.

Review aggregator Rotten Tomatoes sampled 23 reviewers and judged 96% of the reviews to be positive. With a mean score of 8.7/10, the site's consensus states, "Horace and Pete creator Louis C.K. uses his signature blend of awkward humor – and brilliant performances from a top-notch cast – to pull off an engagingly ambitious experiment in TV tragicomedy." On Metacritic the series has a score of 78 out of 100, based on 12 critics, indicating "generally favorable reviews".

Accolades
In 2016, Louis C.K. entered the series in the drama category for the 68th Primetime Emmy Awards. Lead actors C.K. and Steve Buscemi, supporting actors Alan Alda, Steven Wright, Kurt Metzger, Jessica Lange and Edie Falco, and guest stars Laurie Metcalf and Aidy Bryant were reportedly submitted for nomination by C.K. Nominations were announced in July 2016 and the series received two nominations: Laurie Metcalf for Outstanding Guest Actress in a Drama Series and Gina Sansom for Outstanding Multi-Camera Picture Editing for a Comedy Series.

Horace and Pete won the Peabody Award in 2016, the original announcement began: "Horace and Pete is a true original, a melding of contemporary politics and serialized storytelling with a throwback approach to in-studio drama harkening back to 1950s television."

References

External links
 
 

2016 web series debuts
American comedy web series
American drama web series
English-language television shows
Fictional drinking establishments
Mental health in fiction
Peabody Award-winning television programs
Suicide in television
Television series created by Louis C.K.